Spain–Suriname relations are the bilateral and diplomatic relations between these two countries. The embassy of Suriname in Brussels is accredited for Spain. The Spanish embassy in Port of Spain, Trinidad and Tobago, is accredited for Suriname and in addition Spain has an consulate honorary in Paramaribo.

Colonial era 
Christopher Columbus sighted the islands in 1498, but only up to 1593 explorers Spaniards returned to the area, called Suriname, because it was inhabited by the Surinen, a group taíno.
During the first half of the 17th century there were unsuccessful attempts by Spaniards, British, French and Netherlands to settle in place, largely due to the resistance of natives, breaking that resistance in 1651, when the Englishman Francis Willoughby established an advance in what is currently Paramaribo.

Diplomatic relations 
Spain maintains diplomatic relations with Suriname since 1976. The Embassy resident in Port of Spain (Trinidad and Tobago) is accredited before the Surinamese Authorities. Ambassador José María Fernández López de Turiso presented his style copies to the MAE in April 2014, and presented the Credentials to the President in November 2014.

See also
 Foreign relations of Spain
 Foreign relations of Suriname

References 

 
Suriname
Spain